Sir James Ralph Darling, CMG, OBE (18 June 1899 – 1 November 1995) was the English-born Australian headmaster of Geelong Grammar School (1930–1961), and Chairman of the Australian Broadcasting Commission (1961–1967).

Early life
Darling was born in Tonbridge, England, the second child of an Englishman, Augustine Major Darling, and his Scottish wife, Jane Baird, née Nimmo. He was educated at the preparatory school in Tonbridge run by his father, then at Repton School, a boarding school in Derbyshire. He served as a Second Lieutenant in the Royal Field Artillery in France and occupied Germany in 1918 and 1919 before reading history at Oriel College, Oxford. He taught from 1921 to 1924 at Merchant Taylors' School in Liverpool, before joining the staff of Charterhouse in Surrey.

Headmaster
He was appointed as Headmaster of Geelong Grammar School in 1930 and the student population of the school grew from 370 to 1139 at the time of his retirement. He was a founding member of the Headmasters' Conference of the Independent Schools of Australia and was its sixth Chairman. During his time at Geelong, Darling set up the Outward Bound campus Timbertop in the foothills of the Australian Alps between Mansfield and Mt Buller where academic work was supplemented by a wide range of physical activity. Notable pupils included future prime minister John Gorton and Charles, Prince of Wales. Darling was a founder and first National President of the Australian College of Educators. Darling served from 1933 to 1971 on the Council of the University of Melbourne and he was a member of the Universities Commission from 1941 to 1951.

Darling believed that it was of primary importance in education to cultivate sensitivity in students, but that toughness was also required for effective leadership. He revolutionised Geelong Grammar School with his educational philosophy, overhauling the curriculum and focusing less on achievement and more on learning. He encouraged selflessness and hard work over competitiveness and idleness.

ABC Chairman
After his retirement as Headmaster he was for several years Chairman of the Australian Broadcasting Commission (ABC). The decision by the Holt Liberal government in 1967 not to re-appoint him was rumoured to be because of the perceived criticism of the government's policies by the ABC. This led to considerable controversy, involving Mike Willesee, an ABC reporter, who was the son of Don Willesee, a Labor Senator.

Later years
In retirement Darling often wrote for newspapers, and published his own books. In 1988 he was named on a list of 200 great Australians (of whom only 22 were living, he being the only headmaster on the list). He died aged 96 in Melbourne in 1995. In his obituary Darling was referred to as a prophet whose integrity, insight, intelligence and courage gave him great standing in the community.

Honours
 Officer, Order of the British Empire (1953)
 Companion, Order of St Michael and St George (1958)
 Knight Bachelor (1968) for services to education and broadcasting

Publications
 The Education of a Civilized Man: A Selection of Speeches and Sermons (Melb, 1962)
 Timbertop: An Innovation in Australian Education (Melb, 1967)
 Richly Rewarding (Melb, 1978)
 Reflections for the Age (Melb, 1991)

References

Further reading

External links
 

1899 births
1995 deaths
Chairpersons of the Australian Broadcasting Corporation
Chairmen of the Headmasters' Conference of the Independent Schools of Australia
Australian headmasters
20th-century Australian educators
Australian television executives
Alumni of Oriel College, Oxford
Australian Knights Bachelor
Australian Companions of the Order of St Michael and St George
Australian Officers of the Order of the British Empire
British emigrants to Australia
People from Geelong